Microvoluta marginata is a species of medium-sized sea snail, a marine gastropod mollusc in the family Volutomitridae, the mitres.

Description
The length of the shell attains 6mm.

Distribution
It is only known to occur in New Zealand.

References

 Bouchet P. & Kantor Y. 2004. New Caledonia: the major centre of biodiversity for volutomitrid molluscs (Mollusca: Neogastropoda: Volutomitridae). Systematics and Biodiversity 1(4): 467-502.

External links

Further reading 
 Powell A W B, New Zealand Mollusca, William Collins Publishers Ltd, Auckland, New Zealand 1979 
 Tepapa photo, but doesn't look anything like Powell's drawing!

Volutomitridae
Gastropods of New Zealand
Gastropods described in 1885